The 1996 Cerveza Club Colombia Open was a men's tennis tournament played on outdoor clay courts at the Club Campestre El Rancho in Bogotá in Colombia and was part of the World Series of the 1996 ATP Tour. It was the third edition of the tournament and ran from September 9 through September 15, 1996. Thomas Muster won the singles title.

Winners

Men's singles

 Thomas Muster defeated  Nicolás Lapentti 6–7(6–8), 6–2, 6–3
 It was Muster's 7th title of the year and the 43rd of his career.

Men's doubles

 Nicolás Pereira /  David Rikl defeated  Pablo Campana /  Nicolás Lapentti 6–3, 7–6
 It was Pereira's 2nd title of the year and the 5th of his career. It was Rikl's 2nd title of the year and the 11th of his career.

External links
 Official website 

Cerveza Club Colombia Open
Bancolombia Open
1996 in Colombian tennis